Sarah A. Lundy (born August 26, 1954) is an American Thoroughbred horse trainer. In 1984 she became the first female trainer to ever saddle a horse in the Belmont Stakes, third leg of the U.S. Triple Crown series.

From 690 career starts, Sarah Lundy won 85 races. Among her successes, in 1990/91 she won back-to-back runnings of the Ashley T. Cole Handicap at Aqueduct Racetrack in the New York City area where she also won the 1991 Kingston Handicap at Belmont Park. Training during the winter in Florida, she won  the Sam F. Davis Stakes and the Tampa Bay Derby at Tampa Bay Downs in 1993.

References

1954 births
American female horse trainers
Living people
21st-century American women